is a passenger railway station located in the city of Inagi, Tokyo, Japan, operated by East Japan Railway Company (JR East).

Lines

Station layout
The station consists of one elevated island platforms, with the station building located underneath. The station is staffed.

Platforms

History
The station opened on 1 November 1927. With the privatization of JNR on 1 April 1987, the station came under the control of JR East.

Passenger statistics
In fiscal 2019, the station was used by an average of 10,147 passengers daily (boarding passengers only).

The passenger figures for previous years are as shown below.

Surrounding area
 Amelia Inagi Shopping Center
 Yanokuchi Post Office

See also
List of railway stations in Japan

References

External links

 JR East: Station information 

Stations of East Japan Railway Company
Railway stations in Tokyo
Railway stations in Japan opened in 1927
Nambu Line
Inagi, Tokyo